Linda Schaumleffel (born 24 February 1949) is a Canadian rower. She competed in the women's coxed four event at the 1976 Summer Olympics.

References

1949 births
Living people
Canadian female rowers
Olympic rowers of Canada
Rowers at the 1976 Summer Olympics
Sportspeople from Vernon, British Columbia